Sami El Anabi (born 21 July 2000) is a Moroccan professional footballer who plays as a defender for Botola club Wydad AC.

Career
El Anabi sped his youth career in Belgium, before moving to Real Avilés in 2021. On 5 August he moved to the Bulgarian First League team Cherno More. He made his professional debut for the club on 18 September 2021 in a league match against Lokomotiv Sofia. In June 2022 El Anabi left Cherno More by mutual consent. During the same month he moved to the local rivals Spartak Varna.

Career statistics

Club

References

External links
 

2000 births
Living people
Real Avilés CF footballers
PFC Cherno More Varna players
PFC Spartak Varna players
Association football defenders
Moroccan footballers
Moroccan expatriate footballers
Expatriate footballers in Spain
Expatriate footballers in Bulgaria